Randaberg Church is a parish church of the Church of Norway in Randaberg Municipality in Rogaland county, Norway. It is located in the village of Randaberg. It is one of the two churches for the Randaberg parish which is part of the Tungenes prosti (deanery) in the Diocese of Stavanger. The white, wooden church was built in a long church design in 1845 using designs by the architect Hans Linstow. The church seats about 460 people.

History
The earliest existing historical records of the church date back to the year 1316, but the church was not new that year. In 1415, the church underwent some repairs and renovations. During the 1600s, the old church was torn down and replaced with a new timber-framed building. After the new church was completed, the old church was torn down.

See also
List of churches in Rogaland

References

Randaberg
Churches in Rogaland
Wooden churches in Norway
19th-century Church of Norway church buildings
Churches completed in 1845
13th-century establishments in Norway